Puya rusbyi is a species of flowering plant in the Bromeliaceae family. It is endemic to Bolivia.

References

rusbyi
Flora of Bolivia
Taxa named by John Gilbert Baker
Taxa named by Carl Christian Mez